Saidpur, aka Goth Saidpur, is a village and deh in Bulri Shah Karim taluka of Tando Muhammad Khan District, Sindh. As of 2017, it has a population of 1,994, in 365 households. It is the seat of a tapedar circle, which also includes the villages of Beharn, Deghi, Dodi, Jamarkri, and Pakhro. It is also the headquarters of a supervisory tapedar circle, which also includes the tapedar circles of Alipur, Barchani, Miranpur, and Mulan Katiar.

References 

Populated places in Tando Muhammad Khan District